Cheema is a Punjabi Jat clan of India and Pakistan. They have a high concentration in the villages of Gujranwala and adjoining parts of Sialkot. Most people with the surname are Sikhs in East Punjab and Muslims in West Punjab.

Notable people with the surname, who may or may not with affiliated with the clan, are listed below.

Pakistan      
 Aizaz Cheema (born 1979), Pakistani international cricketer
 Akmal Cheema, Pakistani nazim (mayor) of Sialkot District, Punjab, Pakistan
 Amir Abdur Rehman Cheema (c.1978 – 2006), Pakistani who assaulted an editor over Muhammad's  cartoons
 Anwar Ali Cheema, Member, National Assembly of Pakistan from 1985 to 2013, from Sargodha District
 Azam Cheema, Lashkar-e-Taiba operative
 Iftikhar Ahmad Cheema, judge and politician
 Mohammad Afzal Cheema (1913–2008), judge and politician, Acting President of Pakistan
 Nisar Ahmed Cheema, politician and member of the National Assembly of Pakistan from NA-79 and former Director General, Health Services, Punjab
 Pervaiz Iqbal Cheema (born 1940), Pakistani scholar of international relations and strategic studies
 Rizwan Cheema, Canadian cricketer
 Saif Ullah Cheema, Pakistani military officer and politician
 Shafqat Cheema, Pakistani film actor and director
 Dr. Sultan Ahmed Cheema (1908–1990) (Sitara-i-Khidmat), ophthalmologist who established the Cheema Hospital in Daska, Punjab, Pakistan
 Tahir Bashir Cheema, Pakistan Peoples Party member from Bahawalpur District
 Umar Cheema, TV and print journalist in Pakistan
 Omer Sarfraz Cheema, Pakistani politician who serves as 38th Governor of Punjab, Pakistan
 Chaudhry Aamir Sultan Cheema, Pakistani Politician

India 
 Amrik Singh Cheema
 Amrita Cheema, journalist working in India, Germany, Australia
 Avtar Singh Cheema
 Balli Singh Cheema
 Daljit Singh Cheema
 Jaspinder Cheema
 Navtej Singh Cheema
 Neena Cheema
 Palwinder Singh Cheema
 Paul Cheema Singh
 Sajjan Singh Cheema
 Sarbjit Cheema
 Surinder Pal Singh Cheema

Canada 
 Gulzar Singh Cheema (born 1954), Indian-born doctor, Canadian politician
 Jasbir Singh Cheema, Indian Canadian newscaster and politician
 Ranjit Cheema, Indian Canadian gangster and drug trader
 Rizwan Cheema (born 1978), Pakistani-born cricketer for Canada

United Kingdom 
 Bobbie Cheema-Grubb, first British Indian and Asian woman to serve as a High Court judge in the United Kingdom

References

Indian names
Pakistani names
Punjabi-language surnames
Jat clans